Sabahattin Oğlago (born June 25, 1984) is a four-time Olympian cross-country skier from Turkey, competing at the 2002 Winter Olympics in Salt Lake City, 2006 Winter Olympics in Turin, 2010 Winter Olympics in Vancouver and 2014 Winter Olympics in Sochi.

Born in Muş on June 25, 1984, he earned his best finish of 22nd in the team sprint at Turin in 2006, while his best individual finish was 60th in the individual sprint event at Salt Lake City four years earlier.

Oğlago's best finish at the FIS Nordic World Ski Championships was 54th in the 30 km mixed pursuit event at Sapporo in 2007.

His best World Cup finish was 62nd in an individual sprint event at Estonia in 2008. While representing his country at the 2011 World Universities Winter Games in Erzurum, he carried the Turkish flag at the opening ceremony of the games. Competing in the individual sprint category, he ranked fourth in the rankings.

References

External links
 

1984 births
People from Muş
Turkish male cross-country skiers
Olympic cross-country skiers of Turkey
Cross-country skiers at the 2002 Winter Olympics
Cross-country skiers at the 2006 Winter Olympics
Cross-country skiers at the 2010 Winter Olympics
Cross-country skiers at the 2014 Winter Olympics
Living people
21st-century Turkish people